Srpci (Macedonian Cyrillic: Српци) is a village 12 kilometers away from Bitola, which is the second largest city in North Macedonia. It used to be part of the former municipality of Capari.

Demographics
According to the 1467-68 Ottoman defter, Srpci (Serpça) appears as being exclusively inhabited by a Christian Albanian population. Due to Slavicisation, some families had a mixed Slav-Albanian anthroponomy - usually a Slavic first name and an Albanian last name or last names with Albanian patronyms and Slavic suffixes. 

The names are: Jank-o Arbanas, Todor son of Janko (Arbanas), Bogdan son of Arbanash, Pejo son of Bogdan (Arbanash), Stanisha son of Fatmir, Dimitri son of Stanisha (Fatmir), Niko son of Fatmir, Burnik (Burr-nik) son of Pavli, Stala son of Burrnik.

According to the 2002 census, the village had a total of 65 inhabitants. Ethnic groups in the village include:

Macedonians 65

Famous people born in the village of Srpci
Omraam Mikhaël Aïvanhov, philosopher, pedagogue, mystic, and esotericist. A leading 20th-century teacher of Western Esotericism in Europe, he was a disciple of Peter Deunov, the founder of the Universal White Brotherhood.

Galleri

References

Villages in Bitola Municipality